Dunash is a given name. Notable people with the name include:

 Dunash ibn Tamim (10th century), Jewish scholar
 Dunash ben Labrat (early 920s–after 985), Jewish commentator, poet, and grammarian

Masculine given names